The 2014 Qatar Open (also known as 2014 Qatar ExxonMobil Open for sponsorship reasons) was a men's tennis tournament that was played on outdoor hard courts. It was the 22nd edition of the Qatar Open, and part of the ATP World Tour 250 series of the 2014 ATP World Tour. It took place at the Khalifa International Tennis and Squash Complex in Doha, Qatar, from December 30, 2013, to January 5, 2014.

Points and prize money

Point distribution

Prize money 

* per team

Singles main-draw entrants

Seeds

1 Rankings as of December 23, 2013

Other entrants
The following players received wildcards into the singles main draw:
  Karim Hossam
  Malek Jaziri
  Mousa Shanan Zayed

The following players received entry from the qualifying draw:
  Dustin Brown
  Daniel Evans
  Peter Gojowczyk
  Dominic Thiem

ATP doubles main-draw entrants

Seeds

1 Rankings as of December 23, 2013

Other entrants
The following pairs received wildcards into the doubles main draw:
  Malek Jaziri /  Mousa Shanan Zayed
  Rafael Nadal /  Francisco Roig

Finals

Singles 

  Rafael Nadal defeated  Gaël Monfils, 6–1, 6–7(5–7), 6–2

Doubles 

  Tomáš Berdych /  Jan Hájek' defeated  Alexander Peya /  Bruno Soares, 6–2, 6–4

References

External links